Halodhia Choraye Baodhan Khai (Assamese: হালধীয়া চৰায়ে বাওধান খায়, English subtitle: The Catastrophe) is a 1987 Indian Assamese-language film made by director Jahnu Barua. It won the National Film Award for Best Feature Film in 1988 and multiple awards at the Locarno International Film Festival in 1988. It was the third full-length feature film made by Barua.

Awards and recognitions
The film received the National Film Award of India for the best film in 1988. Halodhia Choraye Baodhan Khai won international awards at film festivals. It was first shown in Thiruvananthapuram. The film received several awards at the Locarno International Film Festival in 1988.

See also
Assamese Cinema

References

External links
 
 Page at AllMovie.com containing plot of this movie
 Page at National Film Development Corporation (NFDC) website

Assamese-language films
1987 films
1987 drama films
Best Feature Film National Film Award winners
Films set in Assam
Films directed by Jahnu Barua
1980s Assamese-language films